Samford Stadium may refer to:

Duck Samford Stadium, a football and soccer venue for the Auburn High School Tigers in Auburn, Alabama.
Samford Stadium – Hitchcock Field at Plainsman Park, a baseball venue for the Auburn University Tigers in Auburn, Alabama.
W. James Samford, Jr. Stadium, a football venue for the Huntingdon College Hawks in Montgomery, Alabama.

See also

Sanford Stadium
Stanford Stadium